Miss Teen USA 2000, the 18th Miss Teen USA pageant, was televised live from Shreveport, Louisiana on August 26, 2000.  At the conclusion of the final competition, Jillian Parry of Pennsylvania was crowned by outgoing queen Ashley Coleman of Delaware. 

The pageant was hosted by newcomer Brian McFayden with color commentary by Ali Landry and Julie Moran for the third year.  Landry held the Miss Louisiana Teen USA 1990, Miss Louisiana USA 1996 and Miss USA 1996 titles, making the semi-finals at Miss Teen USA 1990 pageant before winning Miss USA 1996.

During the pageant there were performances by Rachel Lampa, 98 Degrees and Westlife.

Host city
The pageant was held in Shreveport, Louisiana for the third consecutive year.  Following the event, officials in indicated that they were reluctant to host the pageant for a fourth year because disorganization by the Miss Universe Organization meant that the city lost over $70,000 in expected revenue.

Results

Placements

Special awards
Miss Congeniality: Shari Short (Idaho)
Miss Photogenic: Kristen Johnson (Kentucky)
Style Award: Abby Vaillancourt (Georgia)
Best in Swimsuit: Nicole O'Brian (Texas)

Final competition score

Historical significance
This was the first placement for Georgia since Whitney Fuller placed first runner-up, ending its largest period without a placement. Indiana also recorded its first placement since Nicolette VanHook was a semi-finalist in 1994.
Pennsylvania placed for the first time since 1996, when Patricia Campell placed first runner-up to Christie Lee Woods).  Missouri also placed for the first time since 1996.
The District of Columbia placed for the first time since 1987 and Washington for the first time since 1989.

Delegates
The Miss Teen USA 2000 delegates were:

 Alabama - Alexis Dollar
 Alaska - Christine Olejniczak
 Arizona - Sarah Wilkins
 Arkansas - Paula Taylor
 California - Alexandra Thompson
 Colorado - Shannon Herndon
 Connecticut - Lisa DeLeo
 Delaware - Carrie Aiken
 District of Columbia - Tiara Dews
 Florida - Tommie Albright
 Georgia - Abby Vaillancourt
 Hawaii - Lauren Madden
 Idaho - Shari Lynn Short
 Illinois - Kimberly Williamson
 Indiana - Kera Boog
 Iowa - Jennifer Ellison
 Kansas - Sarah Jump
 Kentucky - Kristen Johnson
 Louisiana - Nina Moch
 Maine - Ashley Lynn Marble
 Maryland - Niambi Powell
 Massachusetts - Monique Jones
 Michigan - Kylie Lyn Rhew
 Minnesota - Jennifer Jones
 Mississippi - Jennifer Duke
 Missouri - Caitlin McIntosh
 Montana - Renae Skogen
 Nebraska - Amy Weigert
 Nevada - Melissa Davis
 New Hampshire - Kristen O’Neil
 New Jersey - Ulrica Udani
 New Mexico - Raelene Aguilar
 New York -  Tina Casciani
 North Carolina - Chelsea Cooley
 North Dakota - Amy Kensok
 Ohio - Sarah Thompson
 Oklahoma - Kristen Vaughn
 Oregon - Kari Virding
 Pennsylvania - Jillian Parry
 Rhode Island - Sienna Lyn Piccione
 South Carolina - Morgan Smith
 South Dakota - Nichole Brockhoft
 Tennessee - Casey Porter
 Texas - Nicole O'Brian
 Utah - Heather Crowther
 Vermont - Johanna Velucci
 Virginia - Jennifer Hawkins
 Washington - Megan Munroe
 West Virginia - Ginneene Barone 
 Wisconsin - Erica Gustafson
 Wyoming - Kristin George

Contestant notes
Chelsea Cooley, a non-finalist in the pageant, later won the Miss USA 2005 title as Miss North Carolina USA. She placed 11th in the preliminaries, missing the cut by a slight margin.   
Miss Oregon Teen USA Kari Virding, a non-finalist in the pageant, later won the Miss Oregon 2007 crown.
Kristen Johnson, who placed second runner-up at Miss Teen USA 2000, placed second runner-up to Cooley at Miss USA 2005.  She later appeared in the reality television show Treasure Hunters.
First runner-up Nicole O'Brian won the Miss Texas USA title less than two years after passing on her Teen title, and later placed second runner-up at Miss USA 2003.  Nicole later went on to compete on the fifth season of the Emmy award winning CBS reality show The Amazing Race with her then boyfriend Brandon Davidson.  The duo finished in third place.  Another TX pageant alumni, Christie Woods, competed on the same season with her boyfriend Colin.
Ashley Marble went on to compete in Miss Maine USA 2011, eleven years after participating in Teen. Marble placed first runner-up in the pageant, but had the opportunity to compete in Miss USA 2011 after the original winner resigned. Ultimately, Marble placed in the top 8 of the pageant, after failing to make the semifinals at Miss Teen USA.
In a rare occurrence, Christina Olensjack won the Miss Alaska USA 2002 title only one year after giving up her Teen crown.
Others who competed in Miss USA pageants were Tiara Dews (District of Columbia, 2004), Kristin George (Wyoming, 2006), and Raelene Aguilar (New Mexico, 2008).
Kimberly Williamson, Miss Illinois Teen USA, died on December 27, 2004.  The cause of her death was unknown.  Williamson, who was 23 and living in Knoxville, Tennessee, when she died, was a gemologist who hosted a show on Jewelry Television.
Tina Casciani was originally the first runner-up to Miss New York Teen USA 2000, Emily Pollack. Emily arrived in Shreveport but days later left for reasons unknown. Tina then flew down to take over duties as Miss New York Teen USA and compete in the pageant.
It was confirmed by the VanBros organization, the sponsors of the Miss Missouri Teen USA and Miss Kansas Teen USA pageants, that Caitlin McIntosh won the preliminary interview competition  and that Sarah Jump, Miss Kansas Teen USA, finished in the top 15.

Judges
Tara Dakides
Ramona Gray
William McNamara
Verne Troyer
Wilmer Valderrama

References

External links
Official website

2000
2000 beauty pageants
2000 in the United States
2000 in Louisiana